The 2020–21 season was Arbroath's second consecutive season in the Scottish Championship, following their promotion from Scottish League One in the 2018–19 season. They also competed in the Scottish Cup and Scottish League Cup.

Season summary
In June 2020, eight of the ten clubs voted in favour of shortening the season from the usual 36 games to 27 (playing each other three times), with the season tentatively scheduled to start on 17 October 2020. This was done to reduce costs in light of the coronavirus pandemic.

On 2 October, the SPFL announced that the Scottish Challenge Cup would be cancelled ahead of the upcoming season in order to reduce the number of fixtures being played.

Competitions

Scottish Championship

Matches

Scottish League Cup

Group stage

Knockout phase

Scottish Cup

League table

League Cup table

Transfers

Transfers in

Loans in

Notes

References

Arbroath
Arbroath F.C. seasons